Al-Dhahir is a sub-district located in Khamir District, 'Amran Governorate, Yemen. Al-Dhahir had a population of 31,678 according to the 2004 census.

References 

Populated places in Yemen